The Chemin de fer Baie des Chaleurs  (in English, the Chaleur Bay Railway) was a short line railway that operated in eastern Québec from 1996 to 2007.

Owned by the holding company Quebec Railway Corporation (QRC), CBC operated freight service between Matapédia in the west to Chandler and later Gaspé in the east.

1996 establishment
The Chemin de fer Baie des Chaleurs was established on 1 December 1996 as a subsidiary of QRC to operate the former Canadian National Railway (CN) Cascapedia Subdivision between Matapédia and New Carlisle as well as the western half of the Chandler Subdivision between New Carlisle and Chandler.

This transaction did not include the eastern half of the Chandler Subdivision between Chandler and Gaspé, however, this track was purchased on 16 June 1997 from CN by a non-profit corporation owned by local municipalities called Société de chemin de fer de la Gaspésie (SCFG).  Operation of the eastern half of the Chandler Subdivision was then sub-contracted by SCFG to CBC, creating a seamless  line between Matapédia in the west and Gaspé in the east.

2007 sale to SCFG
In 2007 QRC sold the remainder of CBC's Matapédia to Chandler line to the SCFG which was owned by local municipalities. This small connecting section remained in QRC ownership and was transferred to its subsidiary Chemin de fer de la Matapédia et du Golfe (CFMG). CFMG was sub-contracted to provide freight service for SCFG.

In November 2008 CFMG was sold to CN.

References 

Quebec railways
Gaspé Peninsula
Rail transport in Gaspésie–Îles-de-la-Madeleine